Alexander Pollock (born 21 July 1944) is a former Scottish Conservative Party politician and now a sheriff.

He was educated at Rutherglen Academy, Glasgow Academy, Brasenose College, Oxford and at the University of Edinburgh.  He was employed as a solicitor from 1970 to 1973 before becoming an advocate in 1973. He was Conservative Member of Parliament for Moray and Nairn from 1979 to 1983 and for Moray from 1983 to 1987, when he was defeated by the Scottish National Party candidate Margaret Ewing.

While in Parliament, he was Parliamentary Private Secretary to the Secretary of State for Scotland from 1982 to 1986 and to the Secretary of State for Defence from 1986 to 1987. He was a member of the House of Commons Select Committee on Scottish Affairs from 1979 to 1982 and from 1986 to 1987.

He worked as an Advocate Depute from 1990 to 1991, and was then appointed a floating Sheriff of Tayside, Central and Fife at Stirling. In 1993 he became Sheriff of Grampian, Highland and Islands at Aberdeen and Stonehaven, moving within the sheriffdom to Inverness and Portree in 2001. Since 2005 he has been based at Inverness.

He has been a Member of the Royal Company of Archers since 1984.

References 

Who's Who in Scotland, 2009

External links 
 

1944 births
Living people
People educated at Rutherglen Academy
People educated at the Glasgow Academy
Members of the Parliament of the United Kingdom for Scottish constituencies
Scottish Conservative Party MPs
Members of the Faculty of Advocates
Alumni of the University of Edinburgh
Alumni of Brasenose College, Oxford
UK MPs 1979–1983
UK MPs 1983–1987
Politics of Moray
Members of the Royal Company of Archers